Lorna Marie Boothe  (born 5 December 1954 in Kingston, Jamaica) is an English former 100 metres hurdler. She is the 1978 Commonwealth Games gold medallist and the 1982 Commonwealth Games silver medallist. She is also a former British record holder in the event. She went on to become a senior athletics administrator.
 
She competed in the 1976 Summer Olympic Games in Montreal and 1980 Summer Olympic Games in Moscow and was the gold medalist in the 100m hurdles at the Commonwealth games in 1978 and the silver medallist in the event in 1982. She went on to become the athletics GB team manager for 9 years and was the Senior Team Manager for the 2000 Summer Olympics in Sydney.  She has worked for the International Association of Athletics Federations (IAAF) and was involved in setting up the IAAF Academy and World Class Coaches Club and the lottery funded World Class Performance Programme.  She is a member of English Sports Council Racial Equality Advisory Group and helped set up the Sporting Equals programme with the Commission for Racial Equality.  She coaches hurdlers and sprinters at junior level and is on the Board of the Olympians Committee UK. She was appointed a Member of the Order of the British Empire (MBE) in the 2019 New Year Honours for services to Sports Coaching and Administration.

Her son Tremayne Gilling is a sprinter with a personal best time of 10.25 seconds over 100 metres.

International competitions
All results regarding 100 metres hurdles

References

1954 births
Living people
Sportspeople from Kingston, Jamaica
Jamaican emigrants to the United Kingdom
English female hurdlers
British female hurdlers
Athletes (track and field) at the 1978 Commonwealth Games
Athletes (track and field) at the 1982 Commonwealth Games
Commonwealth Games gold medallists for England
Commonwealth Games silver medallists for England
Olympic athletes of Great Britain
Athletes (track and field) at the 1976 Summer Olympics
Athletes (track and field) at the 1980 Summer Olympics
Commonwealth Games medallists in athletics
Members of the Order of the British Empire
Medallists at the 1978 Commonwealth Games
Medallists at the 1982 Commonwealth Games